Conundrum is an original novel written by Steve Lyons and based on the long-running British science fiction television series Doctor Who. It features the Seventh Doctor, Ace and Bernice. A prelude to the novel, also penned by Lyons, appeared in Doctor Who Magazine #208. This novel is the fourth book in the "Alternate Universe cycle" which continues until No Future.

Plot
What seems to be a simple murder investigation in a quiet English village becomes something far more deadly for the Seventh Doctor and his companions when the inhabitants begin to exhibit superhero abilities...

Continuity

 Conundrum features the Land of Fiction first seen in the 1968 television serial The Mind Robber. Lyons' later New Adventure Head Games is a sequel to this novel and also relates to the Land of Fiction.
 This novel is effectively written in the first person by Jason, the Master of the Land of Fiction. This enables metafictional concepts; for instance, he grows frustrated that he finds it impossible to read the Doctor's mind, a reference to the New Adventures guideline that the books should not show what the Doctor is thinking.
 This novel features the second occasion in which the Doctor manages to repair the TARDIS's chameleon circuit, the previous occasion being the Sixth Doctor story Attack of the Cybermen. Although technically this is not the same TARDIS.

References

1994 British novels
1994 science fiction novels
Virgin New Adventures
Metafictional novels
Novels by Steve Lyons
Seventh Doctor novels